The World's Greatest International Hits is the third album released by Petula Clark in the United States and was the first not to include original material by Tony Hatch. It includes cover songs of other British Invasion groups such as The Beatles and The Honeycombs. Roland Bianchini was credited with the cover photography and Ed Thrasher with art direction.

The album charted at No. 129 on the Billboard 200.

Track listing
Side one
"Never on Sunday" (Manos Hadjidakis, Billy Towne)
"You Can't Keep Me from Loving You" (Kenny Ball, Oscar Brand, Paul Nassau)
"What Now My Love?" (Pierre Delanoë, Carl Sigman)
"Why Don't They Understand" (Jack Fishman, Joe Henderson)
"Have I the Right?" (Ken Howard, Alan Blaikley)
"Volare" (Domenico Modugno, Franco Migliacci)
Side two
"Morgen (One More Sunrise)" (Noel Sherman, Peter Moesser)
"I Want to Hold Your Hand" (John Lennon, Paul McCartney)
"Love Me with All Your Heart" (Maurice Vaughn, Sunny Skylar)
"The Boy from Ipanema" (Vinícius de Moraes, Norman Gimbel)
"I (Who Have Nothing)" (Carlo Donida, Mogol, Jerry Leiber, Mike Stoller)
"Hello, Dolly" (Jerry Herman)

Personnel
Technical
Tony Hatch - arrangements, conductor
Ed Thrasher - art direction
Roland Bianchini - cover photography 

1965 albums
Petula Clark albums
Pye Records albums
Warner Records albums
Albums arranged by Tony Hatch
Albums produced by Tony Hatch